Oscár Marino Echeverry Lourido (born January 13, 1977) is a Colombian football forward, who last played for New York Red Bulls of Major League Soccer.

Club career

Echeverry made his debut in the Colombian First Division in 1996 with Deportivo Cali. He remained at the club two years before joining upstart Deportivo Pasto. While at Pasto he helped the club gain promotion to the Colombian First Division. In 1999 with Deportivo Fasto, Echeverry enjoyed his finest season netting 9 goals in 38 appearances. He would than go on to play for Once Caldas, Deportivo Pereira, BSC Young Boys in Switzerland and Venezuelan side Caracas FC. While at Caracas FC he won a league title and participated in the Copa Libertadores. He also scored the 1,000th goal for Caracas FC in the Venezuelan First division on September 25, 2003.

In 2004, Echeverry joined Colombian power Atlético Nacional. While at Nacional he helped the club to numerous titles. Echeverry cemented his claim as a big game player on June 19, 2005 scoring both goals in a 
2–1 victory over his former club Deportivo Cali helping Nacional reach the 2005 Colombian Apertura Final. On June 26, 2005 Oscar helped the Medellín club celebrate the eighth title in its history as he scored the second goal in a 2–0 victory over Santa Fe in the second leg of the final of the 2005 Torneo Apertura. In total Oscar Echeverry has appeared in 203 Colombian First Division matches in which he has scored 27 goals.

After being sought out by various Colombian sides during the 2008 offseason, including Millonarios and Cúcuta Deportivo, Echeverry signed with New York Red Bulls of Major League Soccer. Echeverry appeared in nine league for New York but did not impress due to injury problems. His season was cut short due to a knee injury that did not properly heal. His best moment with the club was when he scored for Red Bulls on June 25, 2008 in a 1–0 exhibition win over Chivas de Guadalajara in Glendale, Arizona. He was released by New York in April 2009.

International
Echeverry represented Colombia at the under 23 level.

Honours
Deportivo Pasto
 Primera B Colombia: 1998

Caracas FC
 Venezuelan First Division Title: 2004

Atlético Nacional
 Torneo Apertura Colombiano: 2005, 2007 
 Torneo Clausura Colombiano: 2007

External links
eltiempo.com

1977 births
Living people
Colombian footballers
Association football forwards
Deportivo Cali footballers
Deportivo Pasto footballers
Once Caldas footballers
Deportivo Pereira footballers
BSC Young Boys players
Caracas FC players
Atlético Nacional footballers
New York Red Bulls players
Colombian expatriate footballers
Expatriate footballers in Switzerland
Expatriate footballers in Venezuela
Expatriate soccer players in the United States
Categoría Primera A players
Categoría Primera B players
Major League Soccer players
Footballers from Cali